Wild Mouse is a 2017 Austrian comedy film directed by Josef Hader. It was selected to compete for the Golden Bear in the main competition section of the 67th Berlin International Film Festival.

Cast
 Josef Hader as Georg
 Pia Hierzegger as Johanna
 Jörg Hartmann as Waller
 Denis Moschitto as Sebastian
 Georg Friedrich as Erich
 Nora von Waldstätten as Redakteurin Fitz
 Crina Semciuc as Nicoletta

References

External links
 

2017 films
2017 comedy films
Austrian comedy films
2010s German-language films